Harold Arthur "Hal" Fritz (born February 21, 1944) is a retired United States Army officer and a recipient of the United States military's highest decoration, the Medal of Honor, for his actions during the Vietnam War.

Military career
After earning a degree in elementary education from the University of Tampa, Fritz joined the United States Army from Milwaukee, Wisconsin in 1966. By January 11, 1969, he was serving as a first lieutenant in Troop A, 1st Squadron, 11th Armored Cavalry Regiment. During a firefight on that day, in Bình Long Province, South Vietnam during Operation Toan Thang II, Fritz showed conspicuous leadership despite being seriously wounded. He was subsequently promoted to captain and awarded the Medal of Honor for his actions.

Fritz reached the rank of lieutenant colonel before retiring from the army after 27 years of service. In addition to his Medal of Honor, Fitz was awarded the Silver Star, Legion of Merit, Bronze Star Medal with "V" device and oak leaf cluster, Purple Heart with oak leaf cluster, Defense Meritorious Service Medal, Meritorious Service Medal with two oak leaf clusters, and the Army Commendation Medal with oak leaf cluster.

Later life
Fritz currently lives in Peoria, Illinois, and works there at the Department of Veterans Affairs' Bob Michel Outpatient clinic.

Medal of Honor citation
Captain Fritz's Medal of Honor citation reads:

See also

List of Medal of Honor recipients for the Vietnam War

References

External links

 
 

1944 births
United States Army personnel of the Vietnam War
Living people
Recipients of the Legion of Merit
Recipients of the Silver Star
United States Army Medal of Honor recipients
United States Army officers
University of Tampa alumni
Vietnam War recipients of the Medal of Honor